Drew Cost (born January 31, 1989 in West Chester, Pennsylvania) is an American soccer player.

Career

College and amateur
Cost attended Henderson High School, played in the Pennsylvania Olympic Development Program, and played club soccer for the Pennsylvania Classics, before going on to play four years of college soccer at the Pennsylvania State University. At Penn State he was named to the All-Big Ten Freshman Team in 2007, was a two-time All-Big Ten Second Team selection in both 2009 and 2010, and in his senior was a  CoSIDA/ESPN Second Team Academic All-District selection and was named to the Wolstein Classic All-Tournament Team.

During his college years Cost also played for the Lancaster Inferno in their single season in the National Premier Soccer League in 2008.

Professional
Cost was selected with the 32nd pick of the 2011 MLS Supplemental Draft by Real Salt Lake, but was not offered a contract by the team and was released during pre-season.

Cost turned professional when he signed with USL Professional Division club Rochester Rhinos. He made his professional debut on April 23, 2011, in a 3-2 win over the Dayton Dutch Lions. Rochester re-signed Cost for 2012 on October 25, 2011.

References

External links
 Rochester Rhinos profile
 Penn State bio

1989 births
Living people
American soccer players
Association football midfielders
Lancaster Inferno (NPSL) players
Penn State Nittany Lions men's soccer players
People from West Chester, Pennsylvania
Real Salt Lake draft picks
Rochester New York FC players
Soccer players from Pennsylvania
Sportspeople from Chester County, Pennsylvania
USL Championship players